Raymondt Pimienta (born May 7, 1982) is an Aruban football player. He played for Aruba national team in 2002, 2004, and 2008.

National team statistics

References

1982 births
Living people
Aruban footballers
Association football midfielders
SV Racing Club Aruba players
Aruba international footballers